New Mexico State Route 13 (NM 13) is a  state route in Chaves County, New Mexico. NM 13's western end is at U.S. Route 82 (US 82) west of Hope and Artesia, and the eastern end is at US 285 south of Roswell.

Route description

NM 13 begins at an intersection with US 82 west of the city of Hope and begins traveling northeastward. It then ends at an intersection with US 285 south of the city of Roswell.

Major intersections

See also

 List of state roads in New Mexico

References

External links

012
Transportation in Chaves County, New Mexico